Daddy's Hands was a Canadian experimental rock band formed in Victoria, British Columbia, Canada, by singer/guitarist Dave Wenger, bassist Emily Bauslaugh, drummer Jonah Fortune, and saxophonist Jonathan Pollard. Dave Wenger and Emily Bauslaugh had been involved in the British Columbian hardcore/emo scene before forming the band, being in bands M Blanket and Ache Hour Credo, and the band Floragore respectively. Daddy's Hands has released two demo tapes, one EP and two full-length albums. The band gigged extensively in the 90s, even playing a radio show with Nardwuar. Despite achieving little commercial success, the band has been referred to as highly influential in the West Coast music scene. Lead singer Wenger, highly regarded by some critics, has been referred to as Montreal's Peter Laughner.

Releases 
In 1996, the band released two demo tapes, a self-titled debut and Intelligent and Powerful. In 2000 they released a full album, Tutankhamun and a four-song EP in 2002 entitled Ghost in the Bong. Daddy's Hands' original lineup was intact until 2002 when Emily Bauslaugh died of a drug overdose in her Montreal apartment in 2002. After Emily's death, Dave's life took a downward turn and he started drinking more heavily. In May 2005, Dave, the remaining members of the original lineup, and two new members began recording the band's last album, Welcome Kings. Before the album was released, Dave was killed in a hit-and-run accident in Montreal on November 23, 2006. Welcome Kings was released posthumously in July 2007.

Members and influence 
In addition to the primary members noted above, several other people involved with the Canadian music scene have played with Daddy's Hands. Dan Boeckner of Wolf Parade stated in a 2010 interview that he had played with Daddy's Hands for a time. Brooke Cannon of Atlas Strategic joined the band for their 2002 lineup. The Times Colonist reported in 2013 that members of Hank and Lily had played with Daddy's Hands, although the article did not specify which members.

Some members of Daddy's Hands also played in other notable Canadian post-punk and indie rock bands. Johnny Pollard was a founding member of Atlas Strategic along with Boeckner and Cannon. Jonah Fortune and Christoph Hofmeister later played with Pink Mountaintops.

References

Canadian experimental musical groups
Musical groups established in 1996
Musical groups disestablished in 2006
Musical groups from Victoria, British Columbia
1996 establishments in British Columbia
2006 disestablishments in British Columbia